Stanhope Gardens is a garden square and street in the Royal Borough of Kensington and Chelsea in London.

Stanhope Gardens was built from the 1860s after the area began to be developed following the Great Exhibition of 1851. The London Underground railway runs underneath the gardens.

References

External links 

Streets in the Royal Borough of Kensington and Chelsea
Garden squares in London
Squares in the Royal Borough of Kensington and Chelsea
Communal gardens